Shklow is a town in Mogilev Region, Belarus, located  north of Mogilev on the Dnieper River. It has a railway station on the line between Orsha and Mogilev. , its population was 16,439.

History

 1535: First records about the town.
 1654, 1656: Two battles, see battles of Shkloŭ
 April 10, 1762: Coat of arms.

Shklov was an important Jewish religious center. There was a yeshiva there in the 18th century. Shklov became the center of the Haskalah movement. At the end of the 19th century, there were 5542 Jews in the town. Jews traded for a living. A dozen families worked in the Jewish kolkhoz Iskra. In 1939, only 2132 Jews remained in Shklov. The Germans occupied the town on July 12, 1941.

The first execution of Jews took place just a few days into the occupation. The Germans shot 25 Jewish men in Lenin Park. At the end of July 1941, two ghettos were established in the neighboring village of Ryzhkovichi. In August 1941, the Einsatzgruppen arrived in the town and gathered 84 Jews under the pretext of sending them to forced labor. In fact, they were taken to the village of Semyonovka and were shot in the kolkhoz. In September 1941, the Jews were taken to a ravine in Khoduly, between the villages of Putniki and Zarechye. They had to undress and lie in the ditch before being shot. According to Soviet sources, 3200 Jews were killed in Shklow and the surrounding neighborhood.

Alexander Lukashenko, President of Belarus since 1994, held a position as the director of the construction materials plant in Shklow Raion before he became a kolkhoz director and then moved into politics.

Transport
 1 railway station
 3 bus routes

Notable people
The Jewish family name Shklovsky or Shklover indicates that the person or their ancestors come from Shkloŭ.
 Semyon Zorich, Serbian-born Russian General who founded an estate in Shkloŭ (Shklov).
 Yitzhak Salkinsohn, born in Shklov
 Joshua Zeitlin, rabbinical scholar and philanthropist, born here
 Yehoshua Leib Diskin, rabbi in Shklov
 Rogatchover Gaon, studied in Shklov under Yehoshua Leib
 Steve Rosenberg, BBC Russian Correspondent, whose Great-Grandfather was from Shklov and emigrated to England
 Pavel Axelrod (1850–1928), Russian Menshevik revolutionary
 Zalman Shneur (1887–1959), Hebrew and Yiddish poet
 Baruch Schick of Shklov (1744–1808) rabbi and scholar, Hebrew author and translator
 Josef Gusikov, klezmer musician, born in Shklov
 Naum Eitingon, general of the NKVD and murderer of Leon Trotsky, born in Shklov
 Yisroel ben Shmuel of Shklov, Rabbi, disciple of the Vilna Gaon
 Menachem Mendel of Shklov, Rabbi, disciple of the Vilna Gaon, leader of Perushim migration to the Holy Land in 1808
 Rabbi Moshe Feinstein, studied and lived in Shklov before emigrating to the United States to become the preeminent Torah sage and posek of his generation

Gallery

See also
 Battle of Holowczyn

References

External links

Photos on Radzima.org
SHKLOV in the JewishEncyclopedia
The murder of the Jews of Shkloŭ during World War II, at Yad Vashem website
 

Towns in Belarus
Populated places in Mogilev Region
Shklow District
Vitebsk Voivodeship
Mogilyovsky Uyezd (Mogilev Governorate)
Shtetls
Holocaust locations in Belarus
Populated places on the Dnieper in Belarus